Jordanus is the Latin form of Jordan and refers to:

 Jordanus of Bristol, a saint venerated in Bristol, England
 Jordanus or Jordan Catalani, a 14th-century French missionary and explorer
 Jordanus de Nemore (Renaissance version: Jordanus Nemorarius), a medieval mathematician
 Jordanus of Saxony, c. 1190–1237, 2nd Master General of the Order of Preachers (Dominicans)
 Raymundus Jordanus, a 14th-century Christian writer also known as Idiota

It may also refer to:
 Jordanus (constellation), an obsolete constellation name